Skanderborg Municipality is a municipality (Danish, kommune) 
in Region Midtjylland on the Jutland peninsula in central Denmark, just southwest of Aarhus. It covers an area of 462.45 km2, with a population of 64,318 (1. January 2022).

Its mayor as of 1 April 2019 is Frands Fischer, representing the Social Democrats political party.

Skanderborg is the municipality's main town, and serves as the seat of the municipal council.

On 1 January 2007 Skanderborg municipality was, as the result of Kommunalreformen ("The Municipal Reform" of 2007), merged with Galten, Ry, and Hørning municipalities, along with Voerladegård Parish from Brædstrup municipality, to form the present, expanded "Skanderborg Municipality". The former municipality covered an area of 143.22 km2, and had a population of 21,745 (2003). Its last mayor was Aleksander Aagaard, a member of the agrarian liberal Venstre political party.

The municipality is part of Business Region Aarhus and of the East Jutland metropolitan area, which had a total population of 1.378 million in 2016.

Geography

Locations

Politics

Municipal council
Skanderborg's municipal council consists of 29 members, elected every four years.

Below are the municipal councils elected since the Municipal Reform of 2007.

References

Sources 
 Municipal statistics: NetBorger Kommunefakta, delivered from KMD aka Kommunedata (Municipal Data)
 Municipal merges and neighbors: Eniro new municipalities map

External links

Municipality's official website
Skanderborg tourist bureau

 

 
Municipalities of the Central Denmark Region
Municipalities of Denmark
Populated places established in 2007